Ox is an object-oriented matrix programming language with a mathematical and statistical function library, developed by Jurgen Doornik. It has been designed for econometric programming. It is available for Windows, Mac OS X and Linux platforms.

The downloadable console version of Ox is free for academic use. A commercial version is available for non-academic use. According to its documentation, it should be cited whenever results are published.

The programming environment for econometric modelling OxMetrics is based on Ox.

See also
 R (programming language)

References

External links
Official site
Documentation

Numerical programming languages